Dayspring Christian Academy is a preschool to Grade 12 private, Christian school in Lancaster, PA. Voted “best school” by Lancastrians in Lancaster County Magazine’s Best of Lancaster awards in 2018, 2019, 2020, and 2021 Dayspring Christian Academy is accredited by the Association of Christian Schools International and Mid-Atlantic Christian Schools Association. Dayspring Christian Academy offers dual credit and AP courses. The school uses the kind of education that was prevalent in America during her first 200 years. Dayspring offers a form of classical education  including logic, rhetoric, Latin, Greek, the sciences, mathematics, history and the arts. This form of education, championed by abolitionist and the Father of American Scholarship and Education, Noah Webster, as well as women’s education advocate, Founding Father, the father of American psychiatry, Benjamin Rush, places the Word of God at the center of every subject.

According to Private School Review, Dayspring Christian Academy ranks among the top 20% of private schools in PA for student body, sports offered, and extracurriculars. Additionally, according to Niche.com, Dayspring Christian Academy ranks in the top 5 Best Private K-12 schools in the Lancaster, PA area.

History

Locations 

 1987-2004 The Lord’s House of Prayer, Vine Street, Lancaster, PA
 1992-1996 The Teamster’s Building, Duke Street, Lancaster, PA
 1996-2004 Pearl Street, Lancaster, PA
 2001-2010 Burle Business Park, New Holland Avenue, Lancaster, PA
 2010–present College Avenue, Mountville, PA

Founding 
Dayspring Christian Academy was founded in 1987.

Attributes

Learning Space 
Dayspring Christian Academy has 24 classrooms total as well as an auditorium and gymnasium, and administrative offices.

Athletics 
Dayspring Christian Academy offers sports to middle and high school students, and clinics for elementary aged students. Middle school sports include boys soccer, girls volleyball, boys basketball, girls basketball, and track & field. High school sports offered include boys soccer, girls volleyball, golf, boys basketball, girls basketball, girls lacrosse, boys volleyball, and track & field. The school’s colors are red, white, and blue, and student athletes are called the Dayspring Warriors. The athletic logo is red, white, and blue with a warrior holding a shield and spear.

School

Location 
Dayspring Christian Academy is located at 120 College Avenue, Mountville, PA 17554. It is within the Mountville borough in Lancaster County, in the state of Pennsylvania, in the United States of America.

Associations, Accreditations 
Dayspring Christian Academy is accredited by the Association of Christian Schools International and Mid-Atlantic Christian Schools Association.

Demographics

References

Christian schools in Pennsylvania
Private schools in Pennsylvania
Schools in Lancaster County, Pennsylvania
Private high schools in Pennsylvania
School districts in York County, Pennsylvania
Elementary schools in Pennsylvania
High schools in Pennsylvania
K-12 schools in Pennsylvania
Private K-12 schools in Pennsylvania
Middle schools in Pennsylvania
Private K–8 schools in Pennsylvania
Private middle schools in Pennsylvania